Wilfrid George Kalaugher (26 November 1904 – 12 August 1999) was a New Zealand athlete and scholar. He was a school master in Marlborough College, England.

Biography
Kalaugher was born in Winchester, New Zealand and he grew up in Devonport. He was dux of Sacred Heart College, Auckland in 1921, where there is now a wing named after him. He attended Victoria University of Wellington, where he studied mathematics and competed in athletics, cricket, and rugby. 

In 1926, he was selected as a Rhodes Scholar to Balliol College, Oxford, where he represented Oxford University in first-class cricket from 1928 to 1931. At the same time he played Minor Counties Championship cricket for Oxfordshire. While at Oxford University, he gained an Oxford Blue after winning a hurdles title.

He represented New Zealand at the 1928 Summer Olympics in Amsterdam, competing in the triple jump and 110 m hurdles.

In 1931, he took up a teaching position at Marlborough College, England, and found his career "amid the playing fields and schools of England". He died in Newcastle upon Tyne.

References

1904 births
1999 deaths
Alumni of Balliol College, Oxford
New Zealand Rhodes Scholars
Athletes from Auckland
Victoria University of Wellington alumni
New Zealand emigrants to the United Kingdom
Schoolteachers from Wiltshire
Olympic athletes of New Zealand
Athletes (track and field) at the 1928 Summer Olympics
People educated at Sacred Heart College, Auckland
New Zealand cricketers
Oxford University cricketers
Oxfordshire cricketers
New Zealand male triple jumpers
New Zealand male hurdlers